Le donne vendicate (also titled The Revenge of the Women, Il vago disprezzato and Le fat méprisé) is a musical farce that consists of two intermezzi by composer Niccolò Piccinni with an Italian libretto by Carlo Goldoni. Goldoni's text had already been used twice previously, in operas by Gioacchino Cocchi (1751) and Giuseppe Scolari (1757). Piccinni's version was first performed at the Teatro alla Valle in Rome in 1763.

Historical background
Le donne vendicate was commissioned by Cecilia Mahony Giustiniani, Princess of Bassano Romano, to be performed for Carnival in 1763. The publisher of the original score, Agostino Palombini, dedicated the printed libretto to her. The production was a critical success at its premiere with particular praise for the beautiful scenery painted by Sig. Giacomo Castellari, the elaborate costumes prepared by Giuseppe Griselli, the moving performances by the singers, and the beauty of the music. The opera ranks as one of the composer's more successful ventures, as witnessed by the large number of scores that survived in Austria, Germany, France, Poland, Italy and elsewhere. The exact date of the first performance is now unknown but it was sometime during Carnival in 1763. The two intermezzi tell one complete story and are meant to be performed together, in between acts of an opera seria.

Roles

Recordings
Le donne vendicate with conductor Diego Fasolis and I Barocchisti. Cast includes: Vincenzo Di Donato as Count Bellezza, Giuliana Castellani as Lindora, Mauro Buda as Ferramonte, and Sylva Pozzer as Aurelia. Released on the Chandos label in 2004.

References
Notes

Sources
 Original libretto: Le donne vendicate : intermezzi per musica a quattro voci da rappresentarsi nel Teatro alla Valle nel carnevale dell'anno 1763 : dedicati a Sua Eccellenza la Sig. principessa D. Cecilia Mahony Giustiniani : principessa di Bassano duchessa di Corbara &c., Rome, Stamperia di San Michele a Ripa, 1763 (accessible for free online at the Library of Congress website)
 Holden, Amanda (Ed.), The New Penguin Opera Guide, New York: Penguin Putnam, 2001. 
 Warrack, John and West, Ewan, The Oxford Dictionary of Opera New York: OUP: 1992 

1763 operas
Operas
Italian-language operas
Libretti by Carlo Goldoni
Intermezzi
Operas by Niccolò Piccinni